Millbrook is a small village and civil parish near Bedford, England. It has a population of 130, increasing to 147 at the 2011 Census. The parish church, dedicated to St Michael and All Angels, is Grade II* listed.

The vale adjoining Millbrook is reputed to be the location that inspired the 'Slough of Despond' in John Bunyan's The Pilgrim's Progress.

Millbrook is also home to the Millbrook Proving Ground and The Millbrook Golf Club, formerly Lyshott Heath Golf Club.

References

External links

Villages in Bedfordshire
Civil parishes in Bedfordshire
Ampthill
Central Bedfordshire District